Mask law may refer to:

 Anti-mask laws, prohibiting concealing one's face
 Laws for face masks during the COVID-19 pandemic, mandating the wearing of masks, especially during the pandemic